Stephanie Bachelor (May 23, 1912 – November 22, 1996) was an American film actress. During the 1940s, Bachelor briefly achieved leading status in supporting features such as Republic Pictures' Secrets of Scotland Yard. However, most of her  appearances were supporting parts.

Filmography

Bibliography
 Hanson, Helen. Hollywood Heroines: Women in Film Noir and the Female Gothic Film. I.B. Tauris, 2007.

References

External links
 

1912 births
1996 deaths
Actresses from Detroit
American film actresses
20th-century American actresses